Monsters, Inc. (also known as Monsters, Incorporated) is a 2001 American computer-animated comedy film produced by Pixar Animation Studios for Walt Disney Pictures. Featuring the voices of John Goodman, Billy Crystal, Steve Buscemi, James Coburn, Mary Gibbs and Jennifer Tilly, the film was directed by Pete Docter (in his feature directorial debut) from a screenplay by Andrew Stanton and Daniel Gerson. The film centers on two monsters, the hairy James P. "Sulley" Sullivan (Goodman) and his one-eyed partner and best friend Mike Wazowski (Crystal), who are employed at the titular energy-producing factory Monsters, Inc., which generates power by scaring human children. However, the monster world believes that the children are toxic, and when a little human girl Boo (Gibbs) sneaks into the factory, she must be returned home before it is too late.

Docter began developing the film in 1996, and wrote the story with Jill Culton, Jeff Pidgeon and Ralph Eggleston, following the idea conceived in a lunch in 1994 attended during the near completion of Toy Story (1995). Stanton wrote the screenplay with screenwriter Daniel Gerson. The characters went through many incarnations over the film's five-year production process. The technical team and animators found new ways to simulate fur and cloth realistically for the film. Randy Newman, who composed the music for Pixar's three prior films, returned to compose the score for its fourth.

Monsters, Inc. premiered at the El Capitan Theatre on October 28, 2001, and was released in theaters in the United States on November 2. Upon its release, it received critical acclaim and was a commercial success, grossing over $577 million worldwide to become the third highest-grossing film of 2001. The film won the Academy Award for Best Original Song for "If I Didn't Have You" and was nominated for the first Best Animated Feature, but lost to DreamWorks' Shrek, and was also nominated for Best Original Score and Best Sound Editing. Monsters, Inc. saw a 3D re-release in theaters on December 19, 2012. A prequel titled Monsters University, which was directed by Dan Scanlon, was released on June 21, 2013. A television series titled Monsters at Work premiered on Disney+ on July 7, 2021.

Plot

In a world inhabited by monsters, the city of Monstropolis harnesses the screams of human children for energy. At the Monsters, Incorporated factory, skilled monsters employed as "scarers" venture into the human world to scare children and harvest their screams, through doors that activate portals to children's bedroom closets. The work is considered dangerous, as human children are believed to be toxic and capable of killing a monster through physical contact. Energy production is declining because children are becoming less easily scared, and the company's CEO, Henry J. Waternoose III, is determined to prevent the company's collapse.

One evening after work, top-ranking scarer James P. "Sulley" Sullivan discovers that an active door has been left in the station of his rival, Randall Boggs. He inspects the door and accidentally lets a young human girl into the factory. Frightened, Sulley unsuccessfully attempts to return the girl, who escapes into Monstropolis, interrupting Sulley's best friend and assistant Mike Wazowski on a date at a sushi restaurant. Chaos erupts when other monsters see the girl; Sulley and Mike escape with her before the Child Detection Agency (CDA) arrives and quarantines the restaurant. Forced to keep the girl hidden in their apartment for the night, Sulley soon realizes that the girl is not toxic and her laughter is able to generate more energy than screams.

At work the next day, Sulley and Mike disguise the girl as a monster. While Mike seeks out her door, Sulley grows attached to her and nicknames her "Boo". Randall, waiting in ambush for the girl, captures Mike by accident and reveals his plan to kidnap children and harvest their screams using his new invention, the Scream Extractor. Sulley rescues Mike, and they set out to inform Waternoose of Randall's plan. Finding Waternoose in a scare simulation room, Sulley demonstrates scare methods to new employees at his insistence, and a frightened Boo shows herself. Waternoose, who reveals that he is working with Randall, kidnaps Boo and uses a door to exile Mike and Sulley to the Himalayas. 

Sulley finds a way back to the monster world, but Mike refuses to go with him. Entering the factory alone, Sulley saves Boo from the Scream Extractor, but Randall tries to kill him. Mike returns to reconcile with Sulley and exposes Randall, who pursues the trio into a door storage vault. He eventually catches up to them, but Boo attacks him, enabling Sulley and Mike to hurl Randall through a door, which they then destroy.

When Mike and Sulley locate Boo's door, Waternoose, accompanied by the CDA, brings it down to the scare floor to arrest Mike and Sulley. Mike distracts the CDA while Sulley and Boo escape, leading Waternoose into the scare simulation room. Waternoose reveals his conspiracy with Randall to kidnap as many children as necessary to keep the company afloat. Mike records the conversation, exposing him to the CDA, and Waternoose is arrested. Undercover CDA director Roz allows Sulley to send Boo home, but has her door demolished.

Afterwards, Sulley retools the company's power generation method to harvest children's laughter instead of screams, as laughter is ten times more powerful. With the energy crisis solved, the factory is now focused on making children laugh to collect energy; Mike becomes the company's top comedian, and Sulley is named the new CEO. Some time later, Mike surprises Sulley with Boo's rebuilt door. Sulley enters the door, hears Boo calling for him, and smiles.

Voice cast

 John Goodman as James P. "Sulley" Sullivan, a huge, intimidating but well-meaning scarer at Monsters, Inc. At the film's beginning, he has been the "Best Scarer" at Monsters, Inc. for several months running.
 Billy Crystal as Mike Wazowski, a short, one-eyed scarer assistant who is Sulley's best friend, roommate, and coworker. He is charming and generally the more organized of the two, but he is prone to neurotics, and his ego sometimes leads him astray.
 Mary Gibbs as Boo, a two-year-old human toddler girl who is unafraid of any monster except Randall, the scarer assigned to her door. She believes Sulley is a large cat and refers to him as "Kitty". The book based on the film gives Boo's "real" name as Mary Gibbs, the name of her voice actress, who is also the daughter of one of the film's story artists, Rob.
 Steve Buscemi as Randall Boggs, a snide and preening monster with a chameleon-like ability to change his skin color and blend in completely with his surroundings, who makes himself a rival to Sulley and Mike in the scream collection.
 James Coburn as Henry J. Waternoose, the CEO of Monsters, Inc., a job passed down through his family for three generations, who is secretly in league with Randall.
 Jennifer Tilly as Celia Mae, a receptionist for Monsters, Inc. and Mike's girlfriend.
 Bob Peterson as Roz, the administrator for Scare Floor F, where Sulley, Mike, and Randall work. She is secretly the head of the CDA, operating undercover inside Monsters, Inc.
 John Ratzenberger as Yeti a.k.a. The Abominable Snowman, a former Monsters, Inc. employee who was banished to the Himalayas. His appearance is based on that of the Abominable Snowman in the 1964 Rankin/Bass animated special Rudolph the Red-Nosed Reindeer.
 Frank Oz as Fungus, Randall's beleaguered assistant.
 Daniel Gerson as Needleman and Smitty, two small janitor monsters who idolize Sulley and operate the Door Shredder when required.
 Steve Susskind as Jerry, a good friend of Waternoose who manages Scare Floor F.
 Bonnie Hunt as Flint, a talent recruiter who trains new monsters to scare children.
 Jeff Pidgeon as Bile, an accident-prone trainee scarer for Monsters, Inc.
 Sam Black as George Sanderson, a scarer at Monsters, Inc. In a running gag throughout the film, he repeatedly makes contact with objects from the human world, resulting in CDA agents tackling him, shaving his entire body, and sterilizing him. He is good friends with coworker Pete "Claws" Ward.

Production

Development

The idea for Monsters, Inc., along with ideas that would eventually become A Bug's Life, Finding Nemo, and WALL-E was conceived in a lunch in 1994 attended by John Lasseter, Pete Docter, Andrew Stanton and Joe Ranft during the near completion of Toy Story. One of the ideas that came out of the brainstorming session was a film about monsters. "When we were making Toy Story", Docter said, "everybody came up to me and said 'Hey, I totally believed that my toys came to life when I left the room.' So when Disney asked us to do some more films, I wanted to tap into a childlike notion that was similar to that. I knew monsters were coming out of my closet when I was a kid. So I said, 'Hey, let's do a film about monsters.

Docter began work on the film that was to become Monsters, Inc. in 1996 while others focused on A Bug's Life (1998) and Toy Story 2 (1999). Its code name was Hidden City, named for Docter's favorite restaurant in Point Richmond. By early-February 1997, Docter had drafted a treatment together with Harley Jessup, Jill Culton, and Jeff Pidgeon that bore some resemblance to the final film. Docter pitched the story to Disney with some initial artwork on February 4 that year. He and his story team left with some suggestions in hand and returned to pitch a refined version of the story on May 30. At this pitch meeting, longtime Disney animator Joe Grant – whose work stretched back to Snow White and the Seven Dwarfs (1937) – suggested the title Monsters, Inc., a play on the title of a gangster film Murder, Inc., which stuck. The film marks the first Pixar feature to not be directed by Lasseter instead being helmed by Docter, as well as Lee Unkrich and David Silverman who served as co-directors. The early test of Monsters Inc was released on October 11, 1998.

Writing
The storyline took on many forms during production. Docter's original idea featured a 30-year-old man dealing with monsters that he drew in a book as a child coming back to bother him as an adult. Each monster represented a fear he had, and conquering those fears caused the monsters to eventually disappear.

After Docter scrapped the initial concept of a 30-year-old terrified of monsters, he decided on a buddy story between a monster and a child titled simply Monsters, in which the monster character of Sulley (known at this stage as Johnson) was an up-and-comer at his workplace, where the company's purpose was to scare children. Sulley's eventual sidekick, Mike Wazowski, had not yet been added.

Between 1996 and 2000, the lead monster and child went through radical changes as the story evolved. As the story continued to develop, the child varied in age and gender. Ultimately, the story team decided that a girl would be the best counterpart for a furry,  co-star. After a girl was settled upon, the character continued to undergo changes, at one point being from Ireland and at another time being an African-American character. Originally, the character of the little girl, known as Mary, became a fearless seven-year-old who has been toughened by years of teasing and pranks from four older brothers. In stark contrast, Johnson is nervous about the possibility of losing his job after the boss at Monsters, Inc. announces a downsizing is on the way. He feels envious because another scarer, Ned (who later became Randall), is the company's top performer. Through various drafts, Johnson's occupation went back-and-forth from being a scarer and from working in another area of the company such as a janitor or a refinery worker, until his final incarnation as the best scarer at Monsters, Inc. Throughout development, Pixar worried that having a main character whose main goal was to scare children would alienate audiences and make them not empathize with him. Docter would later describe that the team "bent over backwards trying to create a story that still had monsters" while still attempting to solve the problem. A key moment came when the team decided "Okay, he's the BEST scarer there. He's the star quarterback" with Docter noting that before that moment "design after design, we really didn't know what he was about." Disney noted to Pixar early on that they did not want the character to "look like a guy in a suit". To this end, Johnson was originally planned to have tentacles for feet; however, this caused many problems in early animation tests. The idea was later largely rejected, as it was thought that audiences would be distracted by the tentacles. Mary's age also differed from draft to draft until the writers settled on the age of 3. "We found that the younger she was, the more dependent she was on Sulley", Docter said.

Eventually, Johnson was renamed Sullivan. Sullivan was also planned to wear glasses throughout the film. However, the creators found it a dangerous idea because the eyes were a perfectly readable and clear way of expressing a character's personality; thus, this idea was also rejected.

The idea of a monster buddy for the lead monster emerged at an April 6, 1998 "story summit" in Burbank with employees from Disney and Pixar. A term coined by Lasseter, a "story summit" was a crash exercise that would yield a finished story in only two days. Such a character, the group agreed, would give the lead monster someone to talk to about his predicament. Development artist Ricky Nierva drew a concept sketch of a rounded, one-eyed monster as a concept for the character, and everyone was generally receptive to it. Docter named the character Mike for the father of his friend Frank Oz, a director and Muppet performer. Jeff Pidgeon and Jason Katz story-boarded a test in which Mike helps Sulley choose a tie for work, and Mike Wazowski soon became a vital character in the film. Originally, Mike had no arms and had to use his legs as appendages; however, due to some technical difficulties, arms were soon added to him.

Screenwriter Daniel Gerson joined Pixar in 1999 and worked on the film with the filmmakers on a daily basis for almost two years. He considered it his first experience in writing a feature film. He explained, "I would sit with Pete [Docter] and David Silverman and we would talk about a scene and they would tell me what they were looking for. I would make some suggestions and then go off and write the sequence. We'd get together again and review it and then hand it off to a story artist. Here's where the collaborative process really kicked in. The board artist was not beholden to my work and could take liberties here and there. Sometimes, I would suggest an idea about making the joke work better visually. Once the scene moved on to animation, the animators would plus the material even further."

Docter has cited the 1973 film Paper Moon as inspiration for the concept of someone experiencing getting stuck with a kid who turns out to be the real expert, and he credits Lasseter for coming up with the “laughter is ten times more powerful than fear” concept.

Casting
Bill Murray was considered for the voice role of James P. "Sulley" Sullivan. He screen tested for the role and was interested, but when Pete Docter was unable to make contact with him, he took it as a "no". The voice role of Sulley went to John Goodman, the longtime co-star of the comedy series Roseanne and a regular in the films of the Coen brothers. Goodman interpreted the character to himself as the monster equivalent of a National Football League player. "He's like a seasoned lineman in the tenth year of his career," he said at the time. "He is totally dedicated and a total pro." Billy Crystal, having regretted turning down the part of Buzz Lightyear years prior, accepted that of Mike Wazowski, Sulley's one-eyed best friend and scare assistant.

Animation

In November 2000, early in the production of Monsters, Inc., Pixar packed up and moved for the second time since its Lucasfilm Ltd. years. The company's approximately 500 employees had become spread among three buildings, separated by a busy highway. The company moved from Point Richmond to a much bigger campus in Emeryville, co-designed by Lasseter and Steve Jobs.

In production, the film differed from earlier Pixar features, as every main character in this movie had its own lead animator – John Kahrs on Sulley, Andrew Gordon on Mike, and Dave DeVan on Boo. Kahrs found that the "bearlike quality" of Goodman's voice provided an exceptionally good fit with the character. He faced a difficult challenge, however, in dealing with Sulley's sheer mass; traditionally, animators conveyed a figure's heaviness by giving it a slower, more belabored movement, but Kahrs was concerned that such an approach to a central character would give the film a "sluggish" feel. Like Goodman, Kahrs came to think of Sulley as a football player, one whose athleticism enabled him to move quickly in spite of his size. To help the animators with Sulley and other large monsters, Pixar arranged for Rodger Kram, a University of California, Berkeley expert on the locomotion of heavy mammals, to lecture on the subject.

Adding to Sulley's lifelike appearance was an intense effort by the technical team to refine the rendering of fur. Other production houses had tackled realistic fur, most notably Rhythm & Hues in its 1993 polar bear commercials for Coca-Cola and in its talking animals' faces in the 1995 film Babe. This film, however, required fur on a much larger scale. From the standpoint of Pixar's engineers, the quest for fur posed several significant challenges; one was to figure out how to animate a large number of hairs – 2,320,413 of them on Sulley – in a reasonably efficient way, and another was to make sure that the hairs cast shadows on other ones. Without self-shadowing, either fur or hair takes on an unrealistic flat-colored look (e.g., in Toy Story, the hair on Andy's toddler sister, as seen in that movie's opening sequence, is hair without self-shadowing).

The first fur test allowed Sulley to run an obstacle course. Results were not satisfactory, as such objects caught and stretched out the fur due to the extreme amount of motion. Another similar test was also unsuccessful, because, this time, the fur went through the objects.

Pixar then set up a Simulation department and created a new fur simulation program called Fizt (short for "physics tool"). After a shot with Sulley in it had been animated, this department took the data for that shot and added Sulley's fur. Fizt allowed the fur to react in a more natural way. Every time when Sulley had to move, his fur (automatically) reacted to his movements, thus taking the effects of wind and gravity into account as well. The Fizt program also controlled the movement of Boo's clothes, which provided another "breakthrough". The deceptively simple-sounding task of animating cloth was also a challenge to animate thanks to those hundreds of creases and wrinkles that automatically occurred in the clothing when the wearer moved. Also, this meant they had to solve the complex problem of how to keep cloth untangled – in other words, to keep it from passing through itself when parts of it intersect. Fizt applied the same system to Boo's clothes as to Sulley's fur. First of all, Boo was animated shirtless; the Simulation department then used Fizt to apply the shirt over Boo's body, and every time she moved, her clothes also reacted to her movements in a more natural manner.

To solve the problem of cloth-to-cloth collisions, Michael Kass, Pixar's senior scientist, was joined on Monsters, Inc. by David Baraff and Andrew Witkin and developed an algorithm they called "global intersection analysis" to handle the problem. The complexity of the shots in the film, including elaborate sets such as the door vault, required more computing power to render than any of Pixar's earlier efforts combined. The render farm in place for Monsters, Inc. was made up of 3500 Sun Microsystems processors, compared with 1400 for Toy Story 2 and only 200 for Toy Story, both built on Sun's own RISC-based SPARC processor architecture.

The scene in which the Harryhausen's restaurant was decontaminated was originally going to feature the restaurant being blown up. Due to the September 11 attacks, the explosion was replaced by a plasma dome.

Release

Marketing
In October 2000, a teaser trailer of Monsters, Inc. was unveiled, which could not only be found online, but was also attached to the home video releases of Toy Story 2. This trailer would be attached to 102 Dalmatians theatrically and can later be seen on the DVD release of The Emperor's New Groove, which was released on May 1, 2001. Another Monsters, Inc. trailer premiered in theaters in June 2001 with the release of Atlantis: The Lost Empire.

Several Happy Meal toys based on the film were released by McDonald's. Meanwhile, Hasbro debuted their own Monsters, Inc. toys at the North American International Toy Fair event.

Theatrical
The film premiered on October 28, 2001, at the El Capitan Theatre in Hollywood, California. It was theatrically released on November 2, 2001 in the United States, in Australia on December 26, 2001, and in the United Kingdom on February 8, 2002. The theatrical release was accompanied by the Pixar short animated film For the Birds.

As with A Bug's Life and Toy Story 2, a montage of "outtakes" and a performance of a play based on a line from the film were made and included in the end credits of the film starting on December 7, 2001.

After the success of the 3D re-release of The Lion King, Disney and Pixar re-released Monsters, Inc. in 3D on December 19, 2012.

Home media
Monsters, Inc. was released on VHS and DVD on September 17, 2002. Both releases are THX certified and feature the animated shorts Mike's New Car and For the Birds. The DVD release gives the viewer the option of viewing the film either in widescreen (1.85:1 aspect ratio) or fullscreen (family-friendly 1.33:1 aspect ratio without pan and scan). On the second disc, there are a variety of bonus features including animated shorts, outtakes, the "If I Didn't Have You" music video, and more. This release set records for the highest single-day DVD sales with 5 million copies being sold on its first day. Although this record was surpassed by Spider-Man two months later, the film continued to hold the highest single-day record for an animated movie until 2003 when Finding Nemo took it. The film was then released on Blu-ray on November 10, 2009, and on Blu-ray 3D on February 19, 2013. While the 2009 Blu-ray release featured a 5.1 DTS-HD Master Audio surround sound track, the 2013 reissue and its 3D counterpart feature a 7.1 channel Dolby TrueHD track.  Monsters, Inc. was released on 4K Blu-ray on March 3, 2020.

Reception

Box office
On opening day, Monsters, Inc. earned $17.8 million, then generated $26.9 million the following day, making it the second-highest Saturday gross of all time, behind The Mummy Returns. It ranked number one at the box office, taking the spot off of K-PAX and putting it into fourth place. The film's debut led to audience declines of Thirteen Ghosts, From Hell, Riding in Cars with Boys and other films. Monsters, Inc. held the record for having the biggest opening weekend of an animated film, making $62,577,067 and surpassing the previous record held by Toy Story 2. The film was ranked as the biggest three-day opening weekend for a Disney film, dethroning Pearl Harbor. It was even the fourth film of the year to reach $60 million in its first three days, just after The Mummy Returns, Planet of the Apes and Rush Hour 2. The film had a small drop-off of 27.2% over its second weekend, earning another $45,551,028. In its third weekend, the film experienced a larger decline of 50.1%, placing itself in the second position just after Harry Potter and the Sorcerer's Stone. In its fourth weekend, however, there was an increase of 5.9%, making $24,055,001 that weekend for a combined $528 million. As of May 2013, it is the eighth-biggest fourth weekend ever for a film.

The film made $289,916,256 in North America, and $287,509,478 in other territories, for a worldwide $577,425,734. The film is Pixar's ninth highest-grossing film worldwide and sixth in North America. For a time, the film surpassed Aladdin as the second highest-grossing animated film of all time, only behind 1994's The Lion King.

In the United Kingdom, Ireland, and Malta, it earned £37,264,502 ($53,335,579), marking the sixth highest-grossing animated film of all time in the country and the thirty-second highest-grossing film of all time. In Japan, although earning $4,471,902 during its opening and ranking second behind The Lord of the Rings: The Fellowship of the Ring for the weekend, it moved to first place on subsequent weekends due to exceptionally small decreases or even increases and dominated for six weeks at the box office. It finally reached $74,437,612, standing as 2001's third highest-grossing film and the third largest U.S. animated feature of all time in the country behind Toy Story 3 and Finding Nemo.

Critical response
The website's critical consensus reads, "Clever, funny, and delightful to look at, Monsters, Inc. delivers another resounding example of how Pixar elevated the bar for modern all-ages animation." Metacritic, which assigns a rating out of 100 top reviews from mainstream critics, calculated a score of 79 based on 35 reviews, indicating "generally favorable reviews". Audiences polled by CinemaScore, gave the film a rare "A+" grade, becoming the second Pixar film to gain an "A+" grade, after Toy Story 2.

Charles Taylor of Salon magazine stated, "[i]t's agreeable and often funny, and adults who take their kids to see it might be surprised to find themselves having a pretty good time." Elvis Mitchell of The New York Times gave it a positive review, praising the film's usage of "creative energy", saying "There hasn't been a film in years to use creative energy as efficiently as Monsters, Inc." Although Mike Clark of USA Today thought the comedy was sometimes "more frenetic than inspired and viewer emotions are rarely touched to any notable degree", he also viewed the film as "visually inventive as its Pixar predecessors".

ReelViews film critic James Berardinelli gave the film 3 stars out of 4 and wrote that the film was "one of those rare family films that parents can enjoy (rather than endure) along with their kids". Roger Ebert of the Chicago Sun-Times gave the film 3 out of 4 stars, calling it "cheerful, high-energy fun, and like the other Pixar movies, has a running supply of gags and references aimed at grownups". Lisa Schwarzbaum of Entertainment Weekly gave the film a "B+" grade and praised its animation, stating "Everything from Pixar Animation Studios – the snazzy, cutting-edge computer animation outfit – looks really, really terrific and unspools with a liberated, heppest-moms-and-dads-on-the-block iconoclasm."

Accolades

Monsters, Inc. won the Academy Award for Best Original Song (Randy Newman, after fifteen previous nominations, for "If I Didn't Have You"). It was one of the first animated films to be nominated for Best Animated Feature (lost to Shrek). It was also nominated for Best Original Score (lost to The Lord of the Rings: The Fellowship of the Ring) and Best Sound Editing (lost to Pearl Harbor). At the Kid's Choice Awards in 2002, it was nominated for "Favorite Voice in an Animated Movie" for Billy Crystal (who lost to Eddie Murphy in Shrek).

Music

Monsters Inc. was Randy Newman's fourth feature film collaboration with Pixar. The end credits song "If I Didn't Have You" was sung by John Goodman and Billy Crystal.

The album was nominated for the Academy Award for Best Original Score and a Grammy Award for Best Score Soundtrack for Visual Media. The score lost both these awards to The Lord of the Rings: The Fellowship of the Ring, but after sixteen nominations, the song "If I Didn't Have You" finally won Newman his first Academy Award for Best Original Song. During his acceptance speech, he jokingly said "I don't want your pity". It also won a Grammy Award for Best Song Written for Visual Media.

Track listing

Chart positions

Lawsuits

Shortly before the film's release, Pixar was sued by children's songwriter Lori Madrid of Wyoming, stating that the company had stolen her ideas from her 1997 poem "There's a Boy in My Closet".

Madrid mailed her poem to six publishers in October 1999, notably Chronicle Books, before turning it into a local stage musical in August 2001. After seeing the trailer for Monsters, Inc., Madrid concluded that Chronicle Books had passed her work to Pixar and that the film was based on her work. In October 2001, she filed the suit against Chronicle Books, Pixar, and Disney in a federal court in Cheyenne, Wyoming. Her lawyer asked the court to issue a preliminary injunction, that would forbid Pixar and Disney from releasing the film while the suit was pending.

In a hearing on November 1, 2001, the day before the film's scheduled release, the judge refused to issue the injunction. On June 26, 2002, he ruled that the film had nothing in common with the poem.

In November 2002, Stanley Mouse filed a lawsuit in which he alleged that the characters of Mike and Sulley were based on drawings of Excuse My Dust, a film that he had tried to sell to Hollywood in 1998. The lawsuit also stated that a story artist from Pixar visited Mouse in 2000 and discussed Mouse's work with him. A Disney spokeswoman responded, saying that the characters in Monsters, Inc. were "developed independently by the Pixar and Walt Disney Pictures creative teams, and do not infringe on anyone's copyrights". The case was ultimately settled under undisclosed terms.

Prequel

A prequel, titled Monsters University, was released on June 21, 2013. John Goodman, Billy Crystal, and Steve Buscemi reprised their roles of Sulley, Mike, and Randall, while Dan Scanlon directed the film. The prequel's plot focuses on Sulley and Mike's studies at Monsters University, where they start off as rivals but soon become best friends.

Other media
An animated short, Mike's New Car, was made by Pixar in 2002 in which the two main characters have assorted misadventures with a car Mike has just bought. This film was not screened in theaters, but is included with all home video releases of Monsters, Inc., and on Pixar's Dedicated Shorts DVD. In August 2002, a manga version of Monsters, Inc. was made by Hiromi Yamafuji and distributed in Kodansha's Comic Bon Bon magazine in Japan; the manga was published in English by Tokyopop until it went out of print. A series of video games, including a multi-platform video game were created based on the film. The video games included Monsters, Inc., Monsters, Inc. Scream Team and Monsters, Inc. Scream Arena. A game titled Monsters, Inc. Run was released on the App Store for iPhone, iPod Touch, and iPad on December 13, 2012.

Feld Entertainment toured a Monsters, Inc. edition of their Walt Disney's World on Ice skating tour from 2003 to 2007. Monsters, Inc. has inspired three attractions at Disney theme parks around the world. In 2006 Monsters, Inc. Mike & Sulley to the Rescue! opened at Disneyland Resort's Disney California Adventure in Anaheim, California. In 2007, Monsters, Inc. Laugh Floor opened at Walt Disney World Resort's Magic Kingdom in Lake Buena Vista, Florida, replacing The Timekeeper. The show is improvisational in nature, and features the opportunity for Guests to interact with the monster comedians and submit jokes of their own via text message. In 2009 Monsters, Inc. Ride & Go Seek opened at Tokyo Disney Resort's Tokyo Disneyland in Chiba, Japan.

In 2009, Boom! Studios produced a Monsters Inc. comic book mini-series that ran for four issues. The storyline takes place after the movie and focuses on Sulley and Mike's daily struggles to operate Monsters Inc. on its new laughter-focused company policy. At the same time, their work is impeded by the revenge schemes of Randall and Waternoose, as well as a human child (indirectly revealed to be Sid Phillips from the Toy Story franchise) who has hijacked the company's closet door technology to commit a string of toy thefts throughout the human world.

Sulley, Mike, Boo, Randall, Celia and Roz appear as playable characters in the video game Disney Magic Kingdoms, being unlocked during the progress of the game's main storyline.

A world based on the film made its debut appearance in the Kingdom Hearts series in Kingdom Hearts III, making it the second Disney-Pixar movie featured in the series after Toy Story. The world takes place after the events of the first film.

Television series

In November 2017, Disney CEO Bob Iger spoke about plans to develop a television series spin-off of Monsters, Inc. among other properties owned by the company. By November of the following year the series was confirmed for Disney+, and would continue the story of the previous films. On April 9, 2019, it was announced that Goodman, Crystal, and Tilly would return as Mike, Sulley, and Celia, respectively for the series. Peterson returns as Roz and also voices her twin sister Roze. Additional cast members  include Ben Feldman as Tylor Tuskmon, Mindy Kaling as Val, Henry Winkler as Fritz, Lucas Neff as Duncan, Alanna Ubach as Cutter, Stephen Stanton as Needleman and Smitty (replacing Gerson), and Aisha Tyler as Tylor's mother Millie. In addition, Ratzenberger returns as Yeti and also voices Tylor's father Bernard. It was released on Disney+ on July 7, 2021. The series begins the day after Waternoose's arrest and follows Tylor who hopes to be promoted to the Laugh Floor.

See also

List of animated feature films
List of computer-animated films

References

Bibliography

External links

 
 Pixar website
 
 
 
 
 

 
2001 comedy films
2001 computer-animated films
2001 3D films
2000s American animated films
2000s monster movies
2000s fantasy comedy films
2000s children's animated films
2000s English-language films
3D re-releases
American animated feature films
American buddy comedy films
American children's animated fantasy films
American computer-animated films
American monster movies
Animated buddy films
Animated films about friendship
Annie Award winners
2001 directorial debut films
2001 films
Fictional companies
Films adapted into comics
Films adapted into television shows
Films directed by Pete Docter
Films produced by Darla K. Anderson
Films set in Nepal
Films scored by Randy Newman
Films that won the Best Original Song Academy Award
Films about parallel universes
Pixar animated films
Films with screenplays by Pete Docter
Films with screenplays by Andrew Stanton
Tokyopop titles
Boom! Studios titles
Walt Disney Pictures animated films
Films about Yeti
Impact of the September 11 attacks on cinema
2000s buddy comedy films
Films involved in plagiarism controversies